Madison Township is one of the eighteen townships of Columbiana County, Ohio, United States. As of the 2010 census the population was 3,196.

Geography
Located in the southeastern part of the county, it borders the following townships:
Elkrun Township - north
Middleton Township - northeast corner
St. Clair Township - east
Liverpool Township - southeast
Yellow Creek Township - south
Washington Township - southwest
Wayne Township - west
Center Township - northwest corner

One unincorporated community is located in Madison Township:
The unincorporated community of West Point, in the north

Name and history

It is one of twenty Madison Townships statewide.
The township was organized in 1809.

Government
The township is governed by a three-member board of trustees, who are elected in November of odd-numbered years to a four-year term beginning on the following January 1. Two are elected in the year after the presidential election and one is elected in the year before it. There is also an elected township fiscal officer, who serves a four-year term beginning on April 1 of the year after the election, which is held in November of the year before the presidential election. Vacancies in the fiscal officership or on the board of trustees are filled by the remaining trustees.

Township Trustees
Wayne Chamberlain, Chairman
Roger W, Walker, Vice Chairman
Bruce R. Barrett

Fiscal Officer
Erin M. Williams

References

External links
County website

Townships in Columbiana County, Ohio
1809 establishments in Ohio
Populated places established in 1809
Townships in Ohio